Ptochostola dirutellus is a moth in the family Crambidae. It was described by Francis Walker in 1866. It is found in Australia.

References

Crambinae
Moths described in 1866